The 2018 Arctic Winter Games, officially known with the slogan "Find Your Power!!!", is a winter multi-sport event which took place in  the South Slave Region of the Northwest Territories, between  18–24 March 2018.

The Arctic Winter Games is the world's largest multisport and cultural event for young people of the Arctic. The Games is an international biennial celebration of circumpolar sports and culture held for a week, each time with a different nation or region as the host. AWG celebrates sports, social interaction and culture. The Games contributes to creating an awareness on cultural diversity, and develops athletes to participate in the competitions with the focus on fair play. The Games binds the Arctic countries together and includes traditional games such as Arctic sports and Dené games.

Around 1,400 athletes from nine teams participated in the games. Around 4,000 people in total took part in the Arctic Winter Games, including all competitors and participants in sports and cultural events.

Organization
The 2018 Arctic Winter Games were set in Hay River and Fort Smith. Todd Shafer was chosen as general manager of the host society and Greg Rowe as president.

Marketing
2018's mascot was a Snowy owl named "Kechi". Out of 80 different suggestions for the design of the mascot competition, the snowy owl won and was appointed by the steering committee.

Participants
Nine contingents participated in the 2018 Arctic Winter Games. The amount of athletes sent by each contingent is shown in parenthesis in the list below.
 Alaska, United States (224)
 Greenland (107) 
 Northern Alberta, Canada (185)
 Northwest Territories, Canada (277) (host)
 Nunavik, Quebec, Canada (52)
 Nunavut, Canada (196)
 Sámi people (29)
 Yamalo-Nenets, Russia (71)
 Yukon, Canada (263)

Venues
The 2018 games were held at various sports venues, schools and facilities in Fort Smith, Hay River and the K'atl'odeeche First Nation.

Sports venues

The following venues hosted sports events during the games.

Cultural venues
The following venues hosted cultural events during the games.

Medal tally

The Games

Sports
251 events in 19 sport disciplines were scheduled in the 2018 Arctic Winter Games program. Curling, dog mushing, figure skating, gymnastics and short track speed skating all returned to the programme after their absence in 2016. 3 skiing sports were held, with biathlon, cross-country skiing and snowboarding. 2 snowshoe events were held, with snowshoe biathlon and snowshoeing. 2 racquet sports were held, with badminton and table tennis. 2 skating events were held, those being figure skating and short track speed skating. Team sports held were basketball, futsal, ice hockey, volleyball and curling. Traditional Inuit sports were also held, with Arctic sports, Dene games, dog mushing and wrestling, the latter also including events for traditional wrestling. Also held was gymnastics.

Alpine skiing was removed from the sports programme due to a lack of facilities.

Calendar

Culture 
The Arctic Winter Games celebrates culture and creates in the participants an awareness of cultural similarities and dissimilarities. Cultural exchange and social interaction are important parts of the Games. Each participating contingent contributes with performances in dance, song, music, plays or art. These cultural events reflect the traditional as well as the modern cultures of the Arctic. Several shows, exhibitions and workshops were available throughout the games.

Hodgson Trophy
At each Arctic Winter Games, the AWG International Committee presents the Hodgson Trophy to the contingent whose athletes best exemplify the ideals of fair play and team spirit. Team members also receive a distinctive pin in recognition of their accomplishment. The Alaskan team and delegation won the Hodgson Trophy at the 2018 Arctic Winter Games.

References

External links

2018 Arctic Winter Games Official Site
Arctic Winter Games Official Site

 
 

Arctic Winter Games, 2018
Arctic Winter Games
2018
Multi-sport events in Canada
International sports competitions hosted by Canada
March 2018 sports events in Canada
South Slave Region
Arctic Winter